The Americas Zone is one of the three zones of regional Davis Cup competition in 2009.

In the Americas Zone there are four different groups in which teams compete against each other to advance to the next group.

Format

The five teams will compete against each other in a Round Robin pool. The top two nations will be promoted to Americas Group III in 2010.

Information

Venue: La Libertad, El Salvador

Surface: Hard – outdoors

Dates: 22–26 April

Participating teams

Round robin

Matches

Bermuda vs. Aruba

US Virgin Islands vs. Panama

Aruba vs. US Virgin Islands

Bermuda vs. Trinidad & Tobago

Panama vs. Trinidad & Tobago

US Virgin Islands vs. Bermuda

Aruba vs. Panama

US Virgin Islands vs. Trinidad & Tobago

Panama vs. Bermuda

Aruba vs. Trinidad & Tobago

External links
Davis Cup draw details

Group IV